Mowshowitz is a surname. Notable people with the surname include:

Abbe Mowshowitz (born 1939), American computer scientist
Deborah Mowshowitz, American biochemist
Zvi Mowshowitz (born 1979), American Magic: The Gathering player